Darren Cahill was the defending champion, but did not compete this year.

Michael Chang won the title by defeating Jim Courier 6–3, 6–3 in the final. Despite the loss, Courier reached the World No. 1 ranking for the first time in his career.

Seeds

Draw

Finals

Top half

Bottom half

References

External links
 Official results archive (ATP)
 Official results archive (ITF)

Singles